Eugene "Owen" Markey (11 July 1883 – 7 November 1968) was an Irish Gaelic footballer. His championship career with the Louth senior team spanned twenty years from 1903 until 1923.

Honours

St. Mary's
Louth Senior Football Championship (1): 1914

Louth
All-Ireland Senior Football Championship (2): 1910, 1912
Leinster Senior Football Championship (3): 1909, 1910, 1912

References

1883 births
1968 deaths
Louth inter-county Gaelic footballers
People from Ardee